Vida robada (English title:Stolen life) is a Mexican telenovela produced by Televisa and transmitted by Telesistema Mexicano.

Cast 
Claudio Brook
Eva Calvo (actress)
Carlos Petrel

References 

Mexican telenovelas
1961 telenovelas
Televisa telenovelas
1961 Mexican television series debuts
1961 Mexican television series endings
Spanish-language telenovelas